The Cassard class (Type F70 AA) was a class of two anti-air warfare destroyers of the French Navy introduced in the latter 1980s/early 1990s. The two classes have a different armament and propulsion system mounted on an identical hull. Their primary role was to provide air cover for a fleet, an aeronaval group, a convoy & a littoral point. Their secondary role was to manage air assets coordination & aircraft control for the force, especially through Link 16.They can also be used for research, identification or presence missions. Both ships were assigned to the Force d'Action Navale. The lead ship of the class, Cassard, was retired in 2019 followed by the retirement of Jean Bart in 2021.

Design
The Cassard-class frigate was initially designed to replace the four  anti-air warfare vessels in service at the time. Initially procured with four ships in the class, (the third and fourth hulls authorized for construction in 1983), the class was cut back to two vessels after the United States chose to terminate the production of the Standard SM-1MR missile. The prolonged design period led to the plans being redrawn several times.

The class shared a common hull design with the Georges Leygues class. The superstructure was composed of a lightweight aluminum alloy that is resistant to fire and corrosion. However the adoption of a similar propulsion system was abandoned early on. The hot exhaust from the Olympus turbines found on the Georges Leygues class was thought to be incompatible with the numerous arrays required in the new design. The ships were crewed by 244 personnel but could accommodate 251.

The class carried one anti-submarine helicopter on a deck placed aft with a hangar provided for storage. Originally supplied with a Eurocopter AS 565 Panther, they were later replaced with the Westland Lynx. The SAMAHE 210 helicopter handling system is adaptable to different types of undercarriages on helicopters and had munitions trucks to position weapon loadouts to assist the arming of the helicopters.

Propulsion
The Cassard class were powered by four SEMT Pielstick 18 PA6V 280 BTC diesels creating a sustained  driving two shafts. The SEMT Pielstick diesels are capable of double super-charging. The engines were placed upon flexible mountings reducing the noise signature of the ship.

Armament
The Cassard frigates were armed with one Mk 13 launcher for the 40 Standard SM-1MR anti-air missiles.

The Cassards were also provided with two Sadral sextuple launchers for 39 Mistral CIWS anti-air missiles.

For anti-ship weaponry, the class was provided with eight MM40 Exocet anti-ship missiles. The frigates also had two fixed torpedo tubes for ten L5 mod 4 torpedoes.

The Cassard class was armed with a Creusot-Loire Compact /55 Mod 68 DP gun. Initially the class was designed to have a second 100 mm main gun on the quarterdeck, however during the design phase the guns were removed and replaced with the helicopter hangar and two Sadral launchers. The vessels were also supplied with two  F2 anti-aircraft guns and four  machine guns.

Electronics 

1 DRBV26C sentry radar
1 Thales SMART-S MK2 (replacing DRBJ11B) 
1 DIBV2A infra-red alert system
2 DRBN34 navigation and landing radar
1 DUBV 24C hull sonar
Syracuse II satellite communication system
1 ARBR 17 radar detector
1 SAIGON radio emission detector
1 ARBB 33 jammer
2 SAGAIE NG decoy launchers
2 DAGAIE decoy launchers

Ships in class

They were decommissioned in conjunction with the introduction of the FREDA air defence frigates in 2021–2022.

Gallery

See also
 List of naval ship classes in service

References

Citations

Sources
 Gardiner, Robert; Chumbley, Stephen & Budzbon, Przemysław (1995). Conway's All the World's Fighting Ships 1947-1995. Annapolis, Maryland: Naval Institute Press. .
 Saunders, Stephen (ed.). Jane's Fighting Ships, 2004-2005 (107 ed.). Surrey: Jane's Information Group. .

External links

Antiaériennes type F70 AA - Marine nationale official site (In French)

 
 
 
Ship classes of the French Navy